This is a timeline documenting events of Jazz in the year 1980.

Events

March
 28 – The 7th Vossajazz started in Voss, Norway (March 28 – 30).
 Featured artists on Vossajazz was Cross Section, E`Olen, Elton Dean Quartet with Kenny Wheeler, Hariprasad Chaurasia Ensemble, Johnny Griffin Quartet, Kristian Bergheim / Andreas Skjold Sextet with Finn Otto Hansen, Kristiansen / Jørgensen Quintet, McCoy Tyner Sextett, Niels-Henning Ørsted Pedersen / Rune Gustafsson Duo, Radka Toneff Quintet, and Stubø / Bjørklund Quartet.

May
 21 – 8th Nattjazz started in Bergen, Norway (May 21 – June 4).
 23 – 9th Moers Festival started in Moers, Germany (May 23 – 26).

June
4 - The Bill Evans Trio starts a four-day stint at the Village Vanguard. It is released after his death in a 6-CD box set on Turn Out the Stars: The Final Village Vanguard Recordings in 1996.

July
 2 – The very first Montreal International Jazz Festival started in Montreal, Quebec, Canada (July  2 – 10).
 4 – The 14th Montreux Jazz Festival started in Montreux, Switzerland (July 4 – 20).
 11 – The 5th North Sea Jazz Festival started in The Hague, Netherlands (July 11 – 13).

September
 19 – The 23rd Monterey Jazz Festival started in Monterey, California (September 19 – 21).

Album releases

Chuck Mangione:  Fun and Games
George Benson:  Give me the Night
Grover Washington Jr.:  Winelight
Larsen Feyten Band:  Larsen Feyten Band
James Ulmer:  Are You Glad to Be in America?
Ronald Shannon Jackson:  Eye on You
Michael Franks: One Bad Habit
Anthony Davis: Lady of the Mirrors
Rova Saxophone Quartet:  Invisible Frames
Om:  Cerberus
Pat Metheny:  80/81
Pat Metheny:  As Falls Wichita, so Falls Wichita Falls
Billy Bang:  Changing Seasons
Julius Hemphill:  Flat Out Jump Suite
Charles Noyes:  Free Mammals
Steve Tibbetts:  YR
World Saxophone Quartet:  WSQ
David Murray:  Ming
Ganelin Trio:  Ancora da Capo
Joanne Brackeen:  Ancient Dynasty
Ran Blake:  Film Noir
Muhal Richard Abrams:  Mama and Daddy
Derek Bailey:  Aida
Evan Parker:  Six of One
Steps Ahead:  Step by Step
Steve Beresford:  Double Indemnity
Music Revelation Ensemble:  No Wave
Jan Garbarek:  Eventyr
David Liebman:  If They Only Knew
Tom Varner:  Quartet
Harvie Swartz:  Underneath It All
Paul Winter:  Callings
World Saxophone Quartet:  Revue
Chico Freeman:  Peaceful Heart, Gentle Spirit
Jack DeJohnette:  Tin Can Alley
Jay Clayton:  All Out
Art Pepper:  Winter Moon

Deaths

 January
 6 – Poley McClintock, American singer (born 1900).
 22 – Ed Garland, American upright bassist (born 1895).
 23 – Babs Gonzales, American vocalist (born 1919).
 28 – Jimmy Crawford, American drummer (born 1910).
 29 – Jimmy Durante, American singer, pianist, comedian, and actor (born 1893).

 February
 9 – Charles Fowlkes, American baritone saxophonist, Count Basie Orchestra (born 1916).
 12 – Norman Keenan, American upright bassist (born 1916).
 18 – Paul Howard, American saxophonist and clarinetist (born 1895).
 19 – Shorty Sherock, American trumpeter (born 1915).

March
 4 – Don Albert, American trumpeter and bandleader (born 1908).
 6 – Bobby Jones, American saxophonist (born 1928).

 April
 20 – Ronnie Boykins, American upright bassist (born 1935).
 22 – Jane Froman, American singer and actress (born 1907).
 28 – Chino Pozo, Cuban drummer (born 1915).

 May
 4 – Joe "Mr Piano" Henderson, British pianist (born 1920).
 31 – Sonny Burke, American musical arranger, composer, big band leader, and producer, Duke Ambassadors (born 1914).

 June
 12 – Stu Martin, American drummer (born 1938).
 14 – Herman Autrey, American trumpeter (born 1904).
 27 – Barney Bigard, American clarinetist (born 1906).

 July
 2 – Amos White, American trumpeter (born 1889).
 9 – Vinicius de Moraes, Brazilian singer, poet, lyricist, essayist, and playwright (born 1913).
 Harlan Lattimore, African-American singer (born 1908).

 August
 4
 Duke Pearson, American pianist and composer (born 1932).
 Pekka Pöyry, Finnish saxophonist and flutist (born 1939).
 26 – Jimmy Forrest, American tenor saxophonist (born 1920).

 September
 5 – Don Banks, Australian composer (born 1923).
 15 – Bill Evans, American pianist and composer (born 1929).
 18 – Dick Stabile, American saxophonist and bandleader (born 1909).
 22 – Jimmy Bryant, American guitarist (born 1925).

 October
 14 – Oscar Alemán, Argentine guitarist, singer, and dancer (born 1909).
 31
 Chauncey Morehouse, American drummer (born 1902).
 Jan Werich, Czech singer, actor, playwright, and writer (born 1905).

 November
 22 – Uffe Baadh, Danish-American drummer (born 1923).

 December
 16 – Keith Christie, English trombonist (born 1931).
 26 – Peck Kelley, American pianist (born 1898).
 29 – Lennie Felix, British pianist (born 1920).
 31 – Irmgard Österwall, Swedish singer (born 1914).

 Unknown date
 Aldo Rossi, Italian reedist and bandleader (born 1911).
 Cosimo Di Ceglie, Italian guitarist (born 1913).

Births

 January
 3 – David Arthur Skinner, British pianist and composer.
 12 – Dominic Lash, British  upright bassist and composer.
 15 – Christoffer Andersen, Norwegian guitarist.
 22 – Lizz Wright, American singer.

 February
 9 – Jackiem Joyner, American saxophonist.
 21 – Takuya Kuroda, Japanese trumpeter.
 27 – Federico Casagrande, Italian guitarist and composer.

 March
 10 – Lars Horntveth, Norwegian saxophonist, clarinetist, percussionist, guitarist, composer, and band leader, Jaga Jazzist.
 20 – Paddy Milner, Scottish singer-songwriter.
 22 – Jay Foote, American bassist and singer.
 31 – Sasha Dobson, American singer-songwriter.

 April
 10 – Jimmy Rosenberg, Dutch guitarist.
 24
 Jelle van Tongeren, Dutch violinist.
 Vincent Peirani, French accordionist, vocalist, and composer.

 May
 5 – Stian Omenås, Norwegian Jazz musician (trumpet), music conductor and composer
 28 – Benedikt Jahnel, German jazz pianist, composer, and bandleader.

 June
 18 – Jasser Haj Youssef, Tunisian violinist.

 July
 8
 Kendrick Scott, American drummer, bandleader, and composer.
 Tyshawn Sorey, American multi-instrumentalist, and composer.
 10 – Julie Crochetière, Canadian singer-songwriter and pianist.

 August
 16 – Øystein Moen, Norwegian pianist, keyboarder, and composer, Jaga Jazzist.
 25 – Pål Hausken, Norwegian drummer, percussion, and composer, In The Country.

 September
 2 – Mark Guiliana, American drummer, composer and bandleader.
 18 – Gustav Lundgren, Swedish guitarist, composer, and record label director.
 25 – Christina Bjordal, Norwegian singer.

 October
 16 – Mary Halvorson, American guitarist.
 17
 Alberto Porro Carmona, Spanish conductor, composer, author, music lecturer, teacher, and saxophonist.
 Manuel Valera, Cuban pianist and composer.
 19
 Morten Schantz, Danish pianist, composer, and band leader, JazzKamikaze.
 Simin Tander, German singer, pianist, and composer.

 November
 4 – Ruslan Sirota, Ukrainian pianist, composer, and producer.
 6 – Lena Nymark, Norwegian jazz singer.
 17 – Colin Vallon, Swiss pianist.

 December
 5 – Ibrahim Maalouf, French-Lebanese trumpeter and composer.
 9 – Anton Eger, Norwegian-Swedish Jazz drummer, JazzKamikaze.
 28 – Andreas Amundsen, Norwegian bassist.

 Unknown date
 Brandi Disterheft, Canadian upright bassist and composer.
 Elana Stone, Australian vocalist, songwriter, pianist, accordion player, and band leader.
 Hannah Marshall, British cellist, vocalist, and composer.
 Martin Blanes, Galician-Spanish guitarist.
 Tim Giles, English drummer and composer.
 Yasek Manzano Silva, Cuban trumpeter and composer

See also

 1980s in jazz
 List of years in jazz
 1980 in music

References

External links 
 History Of Jazz Timeline: 1980 at All About Jazz

Jazz
Jazz by year